Chrysolepis chrysophylla is a species of flowering shrub or tree in the beech family known by the common names golden chinquapin, giant chinquapin, and western chinquapin. It is native to the Pacific coast of the United States.

Description
Shrubby forms of the plant occur in dry areas, higher elevations, and poor soils. The bark is reddish, thin and smooth on young trunks; on older specimens it becomes thicker and platy. The open crown of the large tree is conical in shape. The leathery evergreen leaves are dark green on the upper sides and golden underneath. The species is monoecious, with individuals bearing both male and female flowers. White male flowers are borne in the leaf axils, and a cluster of female flowers is borne beneath them. A spiny bur contains one to three nuts, each about 1 cm in diameter. There is generally a burl at the base of the tree. The tree may sprout from adventitious buds in the burl, a form of vegetative reproduction that is more common in dry areas where it is less likely that seedlings would become established. The tree may live up to 500 years.

The species resembles tanoak, but has chestnutlike fruit instead of an acorn.

Distribution and habitat
Chrysolepis chrysophylla is endemic to the Pacific coast of the United States, growing from extreme southern Washington through western Oregon, south to west-central California. It grows in climax forests dominated by redwood, white fir, western hemlock, and Shasta red fir, or mixes of tree types. It may be an understory shrub, or it may codominate the canopy as a tree. Habitat types where the tree may be found include coastal forests, woodlands, and chaparral. In the western Cascade Mountains it grows in western hemlock forests. In the southern Cascades it grows at higher elevations but takes on a smaller, shrubbier form.

Ecology
The tree is shade intolerant, thus requiring occasional disturbances to propagate. Contrarily, the shrub form can tolerate shade and is relatively indifferent to disturbances. Older trees become affected by heart rot.

The nuts are commonly eaten by squirrels and chipmunks.

Uses
The tree has a heavy, strong wood which is light brown with a pinkish tinge. It rarely grows in large enough quantities to serve commercial purposes.

The nut is edible, having a flavor similar to the hazelnut or filbert. They were consumed by Native Americans.

References

External links
CalPhotos Photo Gallery

Fagaceae
Endemic flora of the United States
Flora of California
Flora of Oregon
Flora of Washington (state)